The Montgomery Ward Building in downtown San Angelo, Texas was a historic department store building designed by architect Oscar Ruffini.  It was built in 1927 and was listed on the National Register of Historic Places in 1988.

It was a two-story buff brick building.  It incorporated elements of an earlier building built in 1906.

See also

Montgomery Ward
National Register of Historic Places listings in Tom Green County, Texas

References

National Register of Historic Places
Montgomery Ward Building, San Angelo, Texas - Archiplanet

Buildings and structures completed in 1927
Buildings and structures in San Angelo, Texas
Economy of Texas
Department stores on the National Register of Historic Places
Montgomery Ward
Commercial buildings on the National Register of Historic Places in Texas
National Register of Historic Places in Tom Green County, Texas